The first season of the American television musical drama series Nashville premiered on October 10, 2012 and concluded on May 22, 2013 on ABC. The series was created by Academy Award winner Callie Khouri and produced by R.J. Cutler, Khouri, Dee Johnson, Steve Buchanan and Connie Britton. The series stars Connie Britton as Rayna Jaymes, a legendary country music superstar whose stardom is beginning to fade, and Hayden Panettiere as rising star Juliette Barnes.

The episodes, except for the pilot, are named after Hank Williams songs.

Cast

Regular cast
Connie Britton as Rayna Jaymes
Hayden Panettiere as Juliette Barnes
Clare Bowen as Scarlett O'Connor
Eric Close as Teddy Conrad
Charles Esten as Deacon Claybourne
Jonathan Jackson as Avery Barkley
Sam Palladio as Gunnar Scott
Robert Wisdom as Coleman Carlisle
Powers Boothe as Lamar Wyatt

Supporting cast
 Recurring cast
Judith Hoag as Tandy Wyatt
Sylvia Jefferies as Jolene Barnes
Lennon Stella as Maddie Conrad
Maisy Stella as Daphne Conrad
Kimberly Williams-Paisley as Peggy Kenter
Chris Carmack as Will Lexington
Jay Hernandez as Dante Rivas
Michiel Huisman as Liam McGuinnis
Tilky Montgomery Jones as Sean Butler
Rya Kihlstedt as Marilyn Rhodes
Susan Misner as Stacy

 Background cast
David Alford as Bucky Dawes
Ed Amatrudo as Glenn Goodman
Kourtney Hansen as Emily
Todd Truley as Marshall Evans
Chloe Bennet as Hailey
Nicholas Strong as JT
Tiffany Morgan as Jeanne Buchanan
J. Karen Thomas as Audrey Carlisle

Guest cast
J. D. Souther as Watty White
Wyclef Jean as Dominic King
Afton Williamson as Makena
Burgess Jenkins as Randy Roberts
David Clayton Rogers as Jason Scott
Yara Martinez as Carmen Gonzalez
J.J. Rodgers as Deb Butler
Katie Couric as herself
Ming-Na Wen as Calista Reeve
Vince Gill as himself
Kip Moore as himself
Dan Auerbach as himself
Brad Paisley as himself
Pam Tillis  as herself
Chris Young as himself (cameo)
Brantley Gilbert as himself (cameo)

Episodes

Specials

U.S. ratings

References

External links

Season 1
2012 American television seasons
2013 American television seasons